Krojczyn is a village in the administrative district of Gmina Dobrzyń nad Wisłą, within Lipno County, Kuyavian-Pomeranian Voivodeship, in north-central Poland.

In 2002 the village had a population of 453.

References

Krojczyn